Francis Henry Dodds (June 9, 1858 – December 23, 1940), was a politician from the U.S. state of Michigan.

Dodds was born on a farm near Waddington in St. Lawrence County, New York. He attended the local schools and moved with his parents to Isabella County, Michigan, in 1866. He graduated from Olivet College and taught school at Olivet and Mount Pleasant, Michigan. He graduated from the law department of the University of Michigan at Ann Arbor in 1880 and was admitted to the bar the same year and commenced the practice of law at Mount Pleasant. He served as city attorney of Mount Pleasant, 1892–1894; and was a member of the board of education, 1894-1897.

Dodds was elected as a Republican from Michigan's 11th congressional district to the 61st and 62nd Congresses, serving from March 4, 1909 to March 3, 1913. He was an unsuccessful candidate for renomination in 1912.

After leaving Congress, Dodds returned to Mount Pleasant and resumed the practice of law in until his death.  He died at the age of eighty-two and is interred at Riverside Cemetery of Mount Pleasant.

References

Francis H. Dodds at The Political Graveyard

1858 births
1940 deaths
People from Mount Pleasant, Michigan
University of Michigan Law School alumni
Michigan lawyers
Republican Party members of the United States House of Representatives from Michigan
Olivet College alumni
19th-century American lawyers
20th-century American lawyers
20th-century American politicians